Tethea octogesima is a moth in the family Drepanidae first described by Arthur Gardiner Butler in 1878. It is found in Japan, Korea, China (Jilin, Shaanxi, Zhejiang), Taiwan and the Russian Far East.

The wingspan is 20–24 mm. Adults have a dark silvery grey tint, with deep black the transverse lines and markings of the reniform and orbicular spots. The lines near the base are more dentated, the central band is wider and its external limiting line irregularly zigzag.

Subspecies
Tethea octogesima octogesima (Japan, Korea, Russian Far East, China: Jilin, Shaanxi, Zhejiang)
Tethea octogesima watanabei (Matsumura, 1931) (Taiwan)

References

Moths described in 1878
Thyatirinae